Donald Brian MacIntyre (born 1955) is a Canadian former politician and criminal from Alberta. He was elected in the 2015 Alberta general election to the Legislative Assembly of Alberta, where he represented the electoral district of Innisfail-Sylvan Lake. MacIntyre resigned on February 5, 2018 after being charged with sexual assault and "sexual interference" (i.e., touching a minor for a sexual purpose). On January 11, 2019, MacIntyre pled guilty to sexual interference and was sentenced to three years in prison, while the charge of sexual assault was withdrawn.

Views on Climate Change 
On January 2, 2017, MacIntyre — while speaking to the press — asserted that man made climate change is not the primary cause of the planet's warming. This is in conflict with the current scientific opinion on climate change, which asserts a 95% confidence that climate change is primarily caused by man. 
 MacIntyre: "Climate change is real, Mr. Thomson. It is cyclical. Man is aggravating it. Man is not the sole cause, are you happy?"
 Graham Thomson (Edmonton Journal): According to scientists who study this, the majority of the increase is man-made.
 MacIntyre: "You can’t say that anymore."
 Another journalist: Why can't you say that anymore?
 MacIntyre: "The science isn’t settled."
The Alberta New Democratic Party - which held a majority government in the legislature - responded by requesting that the Wildrose Party - the official opposition - remove Don MacIntyre from his position as energy critic. Leduc-Beaumont NDP MLA Shaye Anderson was quoted saying "It’s irresponsible to lend climate change-denying conspiracies the credibility of the office of the Official Opposition. Unless (Wildrose Leader Brian) Jean agrees with what Mr. MacIntyre is saying, he must remove him from his position.".

The Wildrose Party responded by issuing a statement that "We get calls daily from Albertans living in NDP-held ridings furious that their MLAs are not listening to their opposition to the carbon tax. I suggest they spend their time listening to those concerns," - in reference to the 20 dollars per ton carbon tax put in place by the Alberta government.

Criminal history 
MacIntyre resigned his seat as legislative representative for Innisfail-Sylvan Lake in February 2018, near the time he was charged with the sexual offenses; sexual assault and sexual interference, involving a girl under the age of 16. The actions occurred between five and ten times between 2010 and 2011, and during the trial MacIntyre claimed that his actions were done during a dark period of his life and part of Satan's plan. He also told his victim during the actions that "God had approved the abuse".

On January 11, 2019 MacIntyre pled guilty to sexual interference and was sentenced to three years in prison, while the charge of sexual assault was withdrawn.

Electoral history

2015 general election

References

External links
 

Wildrose Party MLAs
Living people
1950s births
21st-century Canadian politicians
United Conservative Party MLAs